Craig Allen Johnson (born January 16, 1961) is an American author who writes mystery novels. He is best known for his Sheriff Walt Longmire novel series. The books are set in northern Wyoming, where Longmire is sheriff of the fictional county of Absaroka. The series debuted in 2004 and as of September 2021, Johnson has written 18 novels, two novellas, and many short stories featuring Longmire. Some of the novels have been on The New York Times Best Seller list. In 2012, Warner Horizon adapted the main characters and the Wyoming settings of the novels for a television series. Johnson lives at a ranch where he built a residence in the small town of Ucross, Wyoming—population 25.

Career

Books
As of September 2021, Johnson has authored 23 books featuring Sheriff Walt Longmire. They have been translated into 14 languages and have won numerous awards, including the Nouvel Observateur Prix du Roman Noir and the SNCF Mystery of the Year.

TV adaptations
The A&E TV series Longmire, based on Johnson's novels, premiered on June 3, 2012, with cast members Robert Taylor, Katee Sackhoff, Lou Diamond Phillips, Bailey Chase, Adam Bartley, A Martinez, Zahn McClarnon, and John Bishop. Filmed in New Mexico, Longmire debuted as A&E's number-one original-series premiere of all time with 4.1 million total viewers. After A&E canceled the series, seasons four to six were made for Netflix.

Influence
The success of Johnson's novels is celebrated in an annual festival, called Longmire Days, held in the small town of Buffalo, Wyoming, the real-life inspiration for the series' fictional setting. Close to 12,000 people attend the festival each year, including the author, many of the actors from the TV series, and (on occasion) the publishers and producers.

Personal life
Craig Johnson grew up in Huntington, West Virginia, and attended college at Marshall University.

Johnson lives in Ucross, Wyoming, with his wife Judy.

Bibliography

Walt Longmire series

References

External links

1961 births
Living people
21st-century American novelists
American mystery writers
Western (genre) writers
Writers from Huntington, West Virginia
People from Sheridan County, Wyoming
Writers from Wyoming
20th-century American dramatists and playwrights
American male novelists
American male dramatists and playwrights
20th-century American male writers
21st-century American male writers
Novelists from West Virginia